Beneficial Microbes is a peer-reviewed scientific journal covering research on microbes beneficial to the health and wellbeing of man and animal. It is published by Wageningen Academic Publishers.

External links 
 

Microbiology journals
English-language journals
Publications with year of establishment missing
Publications established in 2010